Primulina gemella is a plant in the family Gesneriaceae, native to Vietnam. The species was formerly placed in the genus Chirita.

Description
Mauve flowers grow singly, only the type specimen had an inflorescence.

Distribution and habitat
Primulina gemella is endemic to Vietnam, where it is confined to the islands of Hạ Long Bay, a UNESCO World Heritage Site. In 2000, the species was considered confined to a single island, but by 2012 had been found on numerous islands. Its habitat is on soil-covered limestone rocks.

References

gemella
Endemic flora of Vietnam
Plants described in 1972